Paolo Pezzi, FSCB (born 8 August 1960) – also known as Pavel Pezzi – is an Italian  prelate of the Catholic Church, currently serving as Latin Rite Metropolitan Archbishop of the Roman Catholic Archdiocese of Moscow (Russian Federation).

Biography

Early life and ministry
HE Msgr Paolo Pezzi was born in Russi, Italy on August 8, 1960. He studied philosophy and theology  at the Pontifical University of St. Thomas Aquinas (Angelicum) in Rome (1985–1990). He was ordained to the priesthood for the Priestly Fraternity of the Missionaries of St.Charles Borromeo in 1990. He subsequently was awarded a Doctorate in Theology (Cattolici in Siberia, le origini, le persecuzioni, l’oggi) by the Pontifical Lateran University. He has worked in Russia since 1993. He was rector of the major seminary of Mary Queen of the Apostles in Saint Petersburg (2006).

Episcopacy
On September 21, 2007, Fr. Pezzi, until then rector of the major seminary of Mary Queen of the Apostles in Saint Petersburg, was appointed Metropolitan Archbishop of the Archdiocese of Mother of God at Moscow by Pope Benedict XVI. He replaced the first Archbishop of the Archdiocese, Tadevush Kandrusievich. He was consecrated in the Cathedral of the Immaculate Conception in Moscow on October 27, 2007 by Archbishop Kandrusievich, HE Msgr Antonio Mennini,  Titular Archbishop of Ferentium and Apostolic nuncio to Russian Federation, and HE Msgr Joseph Werth SJ, Bishop of the Diocese of Transfiguration at Novosibirsk.

On January 19, 2010, he was appointed Grand Prior of Magistral Delegation of Russia of the Order of the Holy Sepulchre.

In 2011 he was granted Russian citizenship and elected President of the Conference of Catholic Bishops of the Russian Federation where he served for two terms.

In 2012 he was appointed member of the Pontifical Council Cor Unum.

Trivia 
Besides his native Italian, he can speak Russian, English, Spanish and Portuguese.

Was a professor at several notable universities in Russia including Novosibirsk State University and Russian State University for the Humanities.

See also
Roman Catholic Archdiocese of Mother of God at Moscow

References

External links

 http://www.catholic-hierarchy.org/bishop/bpezzi.html
 http://www.gcatholic.org/dioceses/diocese/moth0.htm

1960 births
Living people
People from Russi
21st-century Roman Catholic archbishops in Russia
Italian expatriate bishops
Italian emigrants to Russia
Pontifical University of Saint Thomas Aquinas alumni
Pontifical Lateran University alumni
Members of the Order of the Holy Sepulchre
Grand Priors of the Order of the Holy Sepulchre